Basiel Matthys (26 February 1893 – 7 January 1976) was a Belgian racing cyclist. He rode in the 1919 Tour de France.

References

1893 births
1976 deaths
Belgian male cyclists
Place of birth missing